Davide Malacarne (born 11 July 1987 in Feltre, Province of Belluno) is an Italian former multi-discipline cyclist.

Major results

2005
 1st  Junior race, UCI Cyclo-cross World Championships
2006
 3rd Trofeo Alcide Degasperi
2007
 4th Coppa San Geo
2008
 1st Giro del Belvedere
 7th Trofeo Città di San Vendemiano
 8th Trofeo Alcide Degasperi
2009
 2nd Overall Tour of Turkey
 3rd Coppa Sabatini
2010
 1st Stage 5 Volta a Catalunya
2011
 1st  Mountains classification Tirreno–Adriatico
2012
 4th Les Boucles du Sud-Ardèche
 5th Grand Prix d'Ouverture La Marseillaise
2013
 7th Brabantse Pijl
 9th Les Boucles du Sud-Ardèche
2015
 1st Stage 2 (TTT) Vuelta a Burgos
2016
 1st Stage 1 (TTT) Giro del Trentino
 1st Stage 2 (TTT) Vuelta a Burgos

Grand Tour general classification results timeline

References

External links

1987 births
Living people
People from Feltre
Cyclo-cross cyclists
Italian male cyclists
Italian mountain bikers
Cyclists from the Province of Belluno